Boni Pride (born 10 September 1995) is a Solomon Islands international footballer who plays as a defender for Telekom S-League side Henderson Eels.

Career statistics

International

Personal life
Boni Pride is the younger brother of fellow Solomon Islands footballer Joses Nawo.

References

1995 births
Living people
Solomon Islands footballers
Solomon Islands international footballers
Association football defenders